is a Japanese voice actress from Tokyo, Japan.

Voice acting
 Super Doll Licca-chan (1998 TV series) as Assistant A (ep 11), Fumiko Takabayashi (eps 8, 13, 36), Girl (ep 6), O-Hariko-san A (ep 16)
 Legend of Himiko (1999 TV series), Himiko Himejima
 Raimuiro Senkitan (2003 TV series), Sarasa Honda, Theme Song Performance
 Raimuiro Senkitan: The South Island Dream Romantic Adventure (2004 OVA), Sarasa Honda, Theme Song Performance
 Viewtiful Joe (2004 TV series), Koko (ep 11)
 Koi Koi Seven (2005 TV series), Miya Higashikazuno
 Soreyuke! Gedou Otometai (2005 TV series), Yoku Hokke
 Akahori Gedou Hour Rabuge (2005 TV series), Yoku Hokke

Single and album
  released on December 25, 2002, and ranked 131st in Oricon singles charts.
  image song album of the eponymous character released on May 28, 2003.

References

External links
 
 Blog 

1978 births
Living people
Japanese voice actresses
Voice actresses from Tokyo